Anthony John Grayhurst Pearson (born 30 December 1941 in Pinner, Middlesex) is a former English cricketer who played first-class cricket for Cambridge University and Somerset between 1961 and 1963.

Tony Pearson was educated at Downside School and Jesus College, Cambridge. He took 10 for 78 for Cambridge versus Leicestershire at Loughborough in July 1961. Only Sammy Woods (who performed the feat in 1890) has also taken all ten wickets in an innings for Cambridge.

He later qualified as a doctor.

Notes

References
 
 

English cricketers
Somerset cricketers
1941 births
Living people
People educated at Downside School
Alumni of Jesus College, Cambridge
Cambridge University cricketers
Cricketers who have taken ten wickets in an innings